Mongols in China or Mongolian Chinese are ethnic Mongols who were integrated into the nation-building of the Republic of China (1912–1949) after the fall of Qing Empire (1636–1911). Those not integrated broke away in the Mongolian Revolution of 1911 and again in 1921. The Republic of China recognized Mongols to be part of the Five Races Under One Union. Its successor, the People's Republic of China (1949—present), recognized Mongols to be one of the 55 ethnic minorities in China.

As of 2020, there are 6,290,204 Mongols in China, a 0.45% increase from the 2010 national census. Most of them live in Inner Mongolia, Northeast China, Xinjiang and Qinghai. The Mongol population in China is nearly twice as much as that of the sovereign state of Mongolia.

Distribution 
The Mongols in China are divided between autonomous regions and provinces as follows:
 68.72%: Inner Mongolia Autonomous Region
 11.52%: Liaoning Province 
 2.96%: Jilin Province
 2.92%: Hebei Province
 2.58%: Xinjiang Uyghur Autonomous Region
 2.43%: Heilongjiang Province
 1.48%: Qinghai Province
 1.41%: Henan Province
 5.98%: Rest of mainland China

Besides the Inner Mongolia autonomous region, there are other Mongol autonomous administrative subdivisions in China.

Prefecture level:
 Haixi Mongol and Tibetan Autonomous Prefecture (in Qinghai)
 Bayingolin Mongol Autonomous Prefecture (in Xinjiang)
 Bortala Mongol Autonomous Prefecture (in Xinjiang)

County level:
 Weichang Manchu and Mongol Autonomous County (in Hebei)
 Harqin Left Mongol Autonomous County (in Liaoning)
 Fuxin Mongol Autonomous County (in Liaoning)
 Qian Gorlos Mongol Autonomous County (in Jilin)
 Dorbod Mongol Autonomous County (in Heilongjiang)
 Subei Mongol Autonomous County (in Gansu)
 Henan Mongol Autonomous County (in Qinghai)
 Hoboksar Mongol Autonomous County (in Xinjiang)

Classification 

China classifies different Mongolian groups like Buryats and Oirats into the same single category as Mongol along with Inner Mongols. A non-Mongolic ethnic group, the Tuvans are also classified as Mongols by China. The official language used for all of these Mongols in China is a literary standard based on the Chahar dialect of Mongol.

The ethnic classification might be inaccurate due to lack of information regarding the registering policy.

Some populations officially classified as Mongols by the government of the People's Republic of China do not currently speak any form of Mongolic language. Such populations include the Sichuan Mongols (most of whom speak a form of Naic language), the Yunnan Mongols (most of whom speak a form of Loloish language), and the Mongols of Henan Mongol Autonomous County in Qinghai (most of whom speak Amdo Tibetan and/or Chinese).

Genetics 
According to a 2021 study, the Y-chromosomal haplogroup O2 (49.14%) ranked first among the Mongols of China, followed by C2 (22.86%), O1 (12.00%) and N1 (6.29%)  .  Y-chromosomal haplogroups D1, E, I, G, Q, and R were sparsely distributed in the studied Mongolian populations.  Among the Mongols of China, mitochondrial haplogroup D was in first place (27.07%), followed by mitochondrial haplogroups B (11.60%), F (10.77%), Z (8.01%), G (7,  73%), C (6.91%), A (6.08%), N (5.25%) and M7 (5.25%).  Other mitochondrial haplogroups (HV, H, I, M8, M9, M10, M11, R, T, U, W and Y) were sporadically distributed among the studied Mongols of China with frequencies of no more than 1.66%

Related groups 
Not all groups of people related to the medieval Mongols are officially classified as Mongols under the current system. Other official ethnic groups in China which speak Mongolic languages include:

 the Dongxiang of Gansu Province
 the Monguor of Qinghai and Gansu Provinces
 the Daur of Inner Mongolia
 the Bonan of Gansu Province
 some of the Yugurs of Gansu Province (other Yugurs speak a Turkic language)
 the Kuangjia Hui of Qinghai Province

Notable people 
 Sengge Rinchen, Qing dynasty nobleman and general
 Minggatu, ethnic Mongolian Chinese mathematician during the Qing dynasty
 Ulanhu, politician, former Chairman of Inner Mongolia, former Vice President of the People's Republic
 Bayanqolu, Communist Party Secretary of Jilin Province, former Party Secretary of Ningbo
 Uyunqimg, former Vice-Chair of the Standing Committee of the National People's Congress
 Fu Ying, Deputy Foreign Minister, former ambassador to the United Kingdom, Australia and the Philippines
 Li Siguang, geologist, founder of China's geomechanics
 Yang Shixian, chemist, chancellor of Nankai University
 Siqin Gaowa, actress
 Mengke Bateer, CBA and NBA basketball player
 Bao Xishun, one of the tallest people in the world
 Tengger, a pop/rock musician
 Buren Bayaer, singer, composer and a disc jockey
 Uudam, child singer
 Huugjilt, man wrongfully executed in 1996
 Zhang Xiaoping
 Chinggeltei (1924–2013), linguist, one of the world's few experts on the Khitan language
 Jalsan, linguist and Buddhist leader
 Batdorj-in Baasanjab, actor
 Xiao Qian, academic
 Bai Xue, lawyer and legal academic
 Bai Yansong, TV anchor
 Yangwei Linghua, singer and female vocal of Phoenix Legend
 Han Lei, pop singer
 Wang Lijun, disgraced police chief and political figure
 Bai Wenqi, lieutenant general of the PLA Air Force
 Ulan, deputy party chief of Hunan Province
 Qilu, Director of New Energy Materials and Technology Laboratory of Peking University

Gallery

See also 

 Demographics of China
 Khatso (Yunnan Mongols)
 Mongols
 Mongols in Taiwan
 Oirats (Western Mongols)
 Sichuan Mongols
 Upper Mongols

References

Citations

Sources 

 
  Sečenbaγatur, Qasgerel, Tuyaγ-a [Туяa], Bu. Jirannige, Wu Yingzhe, Činggeltei. 2005. Mongγul kelen-ü nutuγ-un ayalγun-u sinǰilel-ün uduridqal  [A guide to the regional dialects of Mongolian]. Kökeqota: ÖMAKQ. .

Further reading 
 Human Rights in China: China, Minority Exclusion, Marginalization and Rising Tensions, London, Minority Rights Group International, 2007
 de Rachewiltz, Igor. 1981. “ON A RECENT TRANSLATION OF THE MENG-TA PEI-LU AND HEI-TA SHIH-LÜEH: A REVIEW ARTICLE”. Monumenta Serica 35. Maney Publishing: 571–82. https://www.jstor.org/stable/40726521.
 蒙韃備錄 https://archive.org/details/02081581.cn
 黑鞑事略 http://ctext.org/library.pl?if=gb&res=80917 http://www.chinaknowledge.de/Literature/Historiography/heidashilve.html

External links 
 The Mongolian ethnic minority Chinese government information.

 
 
Ethnic groups officially recognized by China